The North Carolina General Assembly of 1860–1861 met in Raleigh, North Carolina in regular session from  November 19, 1860, to February 25, 1861. They met in extra sessions from May 1, 1861, to May 13, 1861, and from August 15, 1861, to September 23, 1861. This General Assembly decided that each county should vote for special delegates who would decide whether North Carolina should secede from the Union. On May 20, 1861, those special delegates convened in Raleigh and voted unanimously that the state would no longer be a part of the United States of America.

Councilors of State
The following persons were elected as Councilors of State on December 20, 1860:
 John W. Cuningham Person
 W. L. Hilliard 
 Council Wooten, Lenoir County
 W. A. Ferguson
 John J. Long 
 David Murphy
 Jesse F. Graves, Surry County

Legislation
The general assembly passed numerous laws in 1860–1861, including the creation of Clay County from Cherokee County; creation of Mitchell County from Burke, Caldwell, McDowell, Watauga, and Yancey Counties; and the creation of Transylvania County from Henderson and Jackson Counties.

The North Carolina Constitution was amended on May 20, 1861, to "dissolve the union between the State of North Carolina and the other states united with her under the compact of government entitled the Constitution of the United States of America."

Members

House of Commons

There were, per the North Carolina Constitution amended in 1825, 120 representatives in the House of Commons.   Some counties had more representatives based on the county population.  William T. Dortch was elected Speaker of the House of Commons.   He served until he left to become the North Carolina Senator for the Congress of the Confederate States of America from 1862 to 1865.  Nathan Neely Fleming was elected as Speaker after he departed.  Edward Cantwell served as clerk.  Eighty-two of the representatives were Southern Democrats.

Senate

Henry Toole Clark was elected Speaker or President of the Senate.  As such, he was first in line of succession to the Governor since there was no Lieutenant Governor until 1868.  When Governor John Willis Ellis died of tuberculosis on July 7, 1861, Senator Clark took over as Governor and remained in that position until September 8, 1862.  He was thrust into this leadership position just as the U.S. Civil War started.  Thirty-two of the Senators were Southern Democrats.

The clerk of the Senate was J.W. Alspaugh.  Senator William Holland Thomas was an adopted chief of the Eastern Band of the Cherokee Nation and represented their interests as he served in the Senate from 1849 to 1861.

Senators William Waightstill Avery and John Motley Morehead served as delegates from North Carolina to the Provisional Congress of the Confederate States of America in the third through fifth sessions in 1861 and 1862.

The following table lists the Senators from the 50 Districts in North Carolina.

References

1860
General Assembly
General Assembly
 1861
 1861
1860 U.S. legislative sessions
1861 U.S. legislative sessions